"Guitar Tango" is a song originally recorded in French in 1961 as "Guitare-Tango". It was written by Georges Liferman, Norman Maine and Jacques Plaint and there were versions recorded by Dario Moreno, Tino Rossi and Maya Casabianca. However, the song is best known for the instrumental version released the following year by British group the Shadows which peaked at number 4 on the UK Singles Chart.

Track listings
7": Columbia / DB 4870
 "Guitar Tango" – 2:59
 "What a Lovely Tune" – 2:17

7": Columbia / C 22 243 (Germany)
 "Guitar Tango" – 2:59
 "Driftin'" – 2:31

7": Columbia / SCMH 5130 (Netherlands)
 "Guitar Tango" – 2:59
 "Nivram" – 3:19

Personnel
 Hank Marvin – acoustic lead guitar
 Bruce Welch – acoustic rhythm guitar
 Jet Harris – electric bass guitar
 Brian Bennett – drums
Norrie Paramor Orchestra – all other instrumentation

Charts

References

1962 singles
Rock instrumentals
1962 songs
Song recordings produced by Norrie Paramor
Columbia Graphophone Company singles
The Shadows songs
1960s instrumentals